Livonia is a city in Wayne County in the U.S. state of Michigan. The population was 95,535 at the 2020 census, which ranked it as Michigan's ninth most-populated municipality.

Originally organized as Livonia Township in 1835, it incorporated as a city in 1950.

History
After most members of the indigenous tribes were pushed out of the area, ethnic European-American pioneers from New England and New York settled here. The borders of Livonia Township were defined by the Legislature of the Territory of Michigan on March 17, 1835.

The settlers named the community "Livonia", after Livonia, New York, a town in the western part of the state from where many had migrated.

Livonia Township was split off from Nankin Township, in which a Livonia post office had been established in June 1834. During the days of the township, a number of small communities developed. One of these was Elmwood, initially known as McKinley's Station. It was a stop on the Detroit, Lansing and Northern Railroad. It had a separate post office from 1858 until 1906. Another post office in the township was Giltedge, which operated from 1899 until 1902.

Livonia was incorporated as a city on May 23, 1950, by vote of the citizens of the township. An incentive was that this status would allow the residents to gain tax revenues from the Detroit Race Course (DRC). From 1985 it ran only harness racing for Standardbred, and the track closed in 1998, when the large property was sold for redevelopment. The last race tracks operating in the state were Hazel Park Raceway, which closed in 2018, and Northville Downs, which closed in 2019.

Among the immigrants attracted to Detroit for its industrial jobs in the 20th century have been Palestinian and Lebanese Christians, as well as Muslims. By 1985, Palestinian Christians had settled in Livonia, as well as the western suburbs of Farmington and Westland. As of 2005, there were a number of Christian Palestinian Americans who had immigrated from Ramallah. They have developed and operated several small and medium-sized businesses.

Six U.S. presidents have visited Livonia: Richard Nixon, Gerald Ford, Ronald Reagan, George H. W. Bush, Bill Clinton and George W. Bush.

Geography

The city has many creeks and rivers, but most notably majority portions of both Newburgh and Nankin Lake in the south and south-west. The two lakes are connected by both a river and Edward N. Hines Drive, known simply as Hines Drive by locals.

Demographics

According to a 2010 American Community Survey, the median income for a household in the city was $65,391, and the median income for a family was $77,119. Males had a median income of $62,071 versus $42,083 for females. The per capita income for the city was $29,536. About 5.4% of families and 7.8% of the population were below the poverty line, including 15.6% of those under age 18 and 3.8% of those age 65 or over.

2010 census
As of the census of 2010, there were 96,942 people, 38,714 households, and 26,856 families living in the city. The racial makeup of the city was 92.0% White, 3.4% African American, 0.2% Native American, 2.5% Asian, 0.4% from other races, and 1.4% from two or more races. Hispanic or Latino people of any race were 2.5% of the population.

There were 38,714 households, of which 29.1% had children under the age of 18 living with them, 55.9% were married couples living together, 9.7% had a female householder with no husband present, 3.8% had a male householder with no wife present, and 30.6% were non-families. Of all households 26.7% were made up of individuals, and 13.1% had someone living alone who was 65 years of age or older. The average household size was 2.47 and the average family size was 3.01.

The median age in the city was 44.5 years. 20.8% of residents were under the age of 18; 7.6% were between the ages of 18 and 24; 22.2% were from 25 to 44; 31.5% were from 45 to 64; and 17.7% were 65 years of age or older. The gender makeup of the city was 48.3% male and 51.7% female.

2000 census
As of the census of 2000, there were 100,545 people, 38,089 households, and 28,071 families living in the city. The racial makeup of the city was 95.45% White, 0.95% African American, 0.22% Native American, 1.94% Asian, 0.01% Pacific Islander, 0.32% from other races, and 1.11% from two or more races. Hispanic or Latino people of any race were 1.72% of the population. 16.3% were of Polish, 15.9% German, 11.2% Irish, 8.6% Italian and 8.5% English ancestry according to Census 2000. Livonia has a substantial Middle Eastern population mostly Arab and trace their ancestry to the Levant region, mainly from Syria, Jordan, Palestine, and Lebanon, and are of the Christian faith. The Arab-American community has few churches in the city, Mainly Saint Mary's Antiochian Orthodox Christian Church. The community settled in Livonia in the late 1960s and has since continued a steady growth.

There were 38,089 households, out of which 32.5% had children under the age of 18 living with them, 62.8% were married couples living together, 8.0% had a female householder with no husband present, and 26.3% were non-families. Of all households 22.9% were made up of individuals, and 11.1% had someone living alone who was 65 years of age or older. The average household size was 2.59 and the average family size was 3.07.

In the city, the population was spread out, with 23.8% under the age of 18, 6.3% was from 18 to 24, 28.7% was from 25 to 44, 24.3% was from 45 to 64, and 16.9% were 65 years of age or older. The median age was 40 years. For every 100 females, there were 94.0 males. For every 100 females age 18 and over, there were 90.8 males.

As of 2000, Livonia was the city in the United States with over 100,000 people that had the highest percentage of non-Hispanic white people.

Economy

In addition to its schools, colleges, churches, parks, recreation center, libraries and the St. Mary Mercy Hospital, Livonia also has commercial and industrial sectors, restaurants and retail stores. Laurel Park Place, an upscale fashion mall with 74 stores, was built in 1989 at 6 Mile Road and Newburgh Road. Von Maur department store serve as the anchor.

The city previously featured two other malls which have since been dismantled. Wonderland Mall was the first, opening in 1959 and closing in 2003; it was replaced with a development called Wonderland Village, anchored by Walmart and Target. Livonia Mall was built to the north in 1964. It also closed in 2008 and was redeveloped as Livonia Marketplace, featuring a second Walmart, along with Sears and Kohl's. The Sears store closed in 2020. Other big-box stores are located near Laurel Park Place.

Livonia is home to the Livonia Hockey Association, the largest amateur hockey association in Michigan, as well as two-time state champions the Livonia Knights. The city also boasts the Livonia City Soccer Club, one of the largest soccer programs in the state, with 1,300 participants.

Leading employers
 Ford Motor Company
 Trinity Health
 Livonia Public Schools
 St. Mary Mercy Hospital
 NYX, Inc
 ZF Automotive
 Schoolcraft College
 Roush Performance
 United Parcel Service
 Mastronardi Produce

Arts and culture
The Livonia Public Library includes the Civic Center Library, the Alfred Noble Library, the Carl Sandburg Library, and the Vest Pocket Library.

Government
Livonia's mayor is Maureen Miller Brosnan.  The city is located in Michigan's 11th congressional district.  Livonia is in Michigan's 7th State Senate District, and is represented by Dayna Polehanki (Democrat).

Most of Livonia makes up Michigan's 19th State House District which elected Laurie Pohutsky (Democrat) in 2018.  A part of southeast Livonia is in the 11th district which is represented by, Jewell Jones (Democrat).

Education

Colleges and universities

Various private and public colleges and universities are located in Livonia, including Madonna University, Schoolcraft College, and a small University of Phoenix campus. The most recent university to open in Livonia is a Davenport University campus, which opened in 2008.

Primary and secondary schools

Public schools

Most of Livonia is served by the Livonia Public Schools district, consisting of two early childhood centers, thirteen elementary schools, four upper elementary Schools, three middle schools and three high schools. The district also serves students in portions of Westland. A portion of northeast Livonia is served by the Clarenceville School District.

There are currently four high schools in Livonia, all of which are public: Franklin, Churchill and Stevenson high schools in the Livonia Public Schools district; and Clarenceville High School in the Clarenceville Public School District. Ladywood High School, a Catholic all-girls private school run by the Felician Sisters, closed in 2018. Bentley High School, the first high school built in the district, closed in 1985.

Each high school in the Livonia Public School District offers a different educational program. Stevenson High School is the home of the school of Global Education, an alternative education model which combines students' English and social studies classes with a focus on the student's role in the world. Churchill houses the MSC (Math/Science/Computer) and CAPA (Creative and Performing Arts) programs. Franklin currently offers an International Baccalaureate program for select students.

Frost Middle School houses the Middle School Alternative Classrooms for the Academically Talented (MACAT) program. The public K-6 Webster Elementary School is home to the Alternative Classrooms for the Academically Talented (ACAT) program, as well as many after-school programs. Webster also has classes for disabled children. In 2008, the original Webster school was burned down by an arsonist, and Webster was moved to a closed-down school, Tyler Elementary.

Alternative schools
 CAPA, a performance art program at Churchill high school
 MSC (Math, Science, Computers) a program for the academically gifted housed at Churchill High School.

Private schools
 Ladywood High School, a private, Roman Catholic, all-girls high school in Livonia (closed in 2018)
 St. Edith and St. Michael Catholic grade schools
 St. Michael the Archangel School - The school began on September 21, 1942, and the building used for the school had a second story installed after the archdiocese granted permission for this on November 9, 1943. The addition was installed from January to May 1944. There were 345 students for the 1944–1945 school year. On September 24, 1997 construction began for a new addition with a cost of $3.4 million. Construction finished before September 8, 1998, with dedication on October 11 of that year. The addition included a cafeteria, a library, a gymnasium, a computer lab, and six classrooms.
 Peace Lutheran School (Pre-K-8) and St. Paul's Lutheran School (Pre-K-8) are affiliated with the Wisconsin Evangelical Lutheran Synod.

St. Genevieve Catholic School closed in 2016.

Media
The Metro Detroit–area newspapers are the Detroit Free Press and The Detroit News. The Livonia Observer is printed twice a week, on Thursdays and Sundays.

The newspaper Between the Lines and the website PrideSource are headquartered in Livonia.

Infrastructure

Transportation
Livonia has limited access to public bus service through the Detroit Department of Transportation.

In 2012, the National Motorists Association released the results of a public poll on the "Worst Speed Trap Cities" in North America. Livonia was listed at #2.

Notable people
Janet M. Anderson, commercial artist who depicted Detroit
Chuck Behler, musician, drummer for Megadeth 1987–1989
Doug Brzezinski, former NFL player for the  Philadelphia Eagles and the Carolina Panthers
Bernie Carbo, Major League Baseball outfielder from 1969 to 1980 (Franklin High School Class of 1965)
Charlie Collins, member of the Arkansas House of Representatives from Fayetteville
Chris Conner, professional hockey player for the Washington Capitals
Mike Cox, former Attorney General of Michigan
Nancy Jane Dean, teacher and Presbyterian missionary in Persia
Warren Defever, musician and producer
Mike Donnelly, professional hockey player for five NHL teams
Judy Greer, actress
Charlie Haeger, pitcher for three Major League Baseball teams
Al Iafrate, professional hockey player for four NHL teams
Ryan Kesler, professional hockey player for the Anaheim Ducks
Jeff Lerg, professional hockey player for the New Jersey Devils
Mike Modano, professional hockey player, inducted into Hockey Hall of Fame
David Moss, hockey player for the Phoenix Coyotes
Cecilia Muñoz, director of the White House Domestic Policy Council
Aaron Palushaj, professional hockey player for the Brynäs IF
FP Santangelo, Major League Baseball player 1995–2001
Dana Schutz, painter
Tim Shaw, professional football player for four NFL teams
Chris Tancill, professional hockey player for four NHL teams
Sheila Taormina, athlete, 1996 Summer Olympics swimming gold medalist in 4 x 200 meter freestyle relay; four-time  Olympian (1996, 2000, 2004, and 2008 Summer Olympics);  first woman to qualify in three different Olympic sports events (freestyle swimming, triathlon and modern pentathlon)
Ken Westerfield, disc sport (Frisbee) pioneer, athlete
Jonathan B. Wright, stage and film actor

Images

See also

Wilson Barn - a historic barn in Livonia

References

Further reading

External links

 
 Chamber of Commerce

 
Cities in Wayne County, Michigan
Metro Detroit
Populated places established in 1835
1835 establishments in Michigan Territory